Peter Solway (born 20 September 1964) is an Australian cricketer. He played in eighteen List A cricket matches for the ACT Comets between 1997 and 2000. In February 2020, he was named in Australia's squad for the Over-50s Cricket World Cup in South Africa. However, the tournament was cancelled during the third round of matches due to the COVID-19 pandemic.

References

External links
 

1964 births
Living people
Australian cricketers
ACT Comets cricketers
Place of birth missing (living people)